Kyle T. Carter (born December 17, 1992) is a former American football tight end. He played college football for the Penn State Nittany Lions.

Early years
Carter was born in New Castle, Delaware to Mitchell and Charlene Carter. He attended William Penn High School where he played for Bill Cole.

Recruiting

College career

2011
Carter redshirted his freshman season.

2012
Coming into spring practice, Carter was listed fourth on the depth chart. But under new coach Bill O'Brien, Carter began to thrive. Carter has been a key part of the Penn State offense during the season.  During week one against Ohio, Carter caught six passes for 74 yards. He caught his first career touchdown pass in week two against Virginia. Carter sat out the game on November 3 against Purdue due to an ankle injury.

Professional career

Minnesota Vikings
Carter signed with the Vikings after going undrafted in the 2016 NFL Draft. On September 3, 2016, he was released by the Vikings as part of final roster cuts.  The next day, he was signed to the Vikings' practice squad. He was released by the Vikings on October 25, 2016. He was re-signed to the practice squad on December 13, 2016. He signed a reserve/futures contract with the Vikings on January 2, 2017.

On September 2, 2017, Carter was waived by the Vikings and was signed to the practice squad the next day. He was promoted to the active roster on December 15, 2017. He was waived by the Vikings on January 13, 2018.

New York Giants
On January 23, 2018, Carter was claimed off waivers by the New York Giants. He was waived on July 25, 2018.

Seattle Seahawks
On July 27, 2018, Carter was claimed off waivers by the Seattle Seahawks. He was waived on September 1, 2018.

Buffalo Bills
On December 12, 2018, Carter was signed to the Buffalo Bills practice squad. On July 29, 2019, he was re-signed by the Bills. He was waived on August 31, 2019.

References

External links
 Kyle Carter Penn State profile

1992 births
Living people
Players of American football from Delaware
People from New Castle, Delaware
Penn State Nittany Lions football players
Minnesota Vikings players
New York Giants players
Seattle Seahawks players
Buffalo Bills players